Château la Tour du Pin Figeac may refer to two Bordeaux wine estates in Saint-Émilion:

 Château La Tour du Pin Figeac (Moueix) 
 Château La Tour du Pin Figeac (Giraud-Bélivier)